Stuart J. Levy is a producer of manga and films and writer of manga.

Levy founded the media company Tokyopop and established the manga market in North America.  He was an executive producer on the major motion picture Priest in 2011 distributed by Sony Pictures. Additionally, he directed the documentary Pray for Japan and mockumentary Van Von Hunter. Van Von Hunter won him "Best Director" at the Los Angeles based Mock Film Fest 2011. He created/wrote Princess Ai with singer Courtney Love. Levy also is a chair of the International Producers Guild of America. Levy appeared as a speaker for the Middle East Film & Comic Con 2018 for his experience as a businessman and producer/artist.
Levy's manga series, Nightmare Before Christmas: Zero's Journey was nominated for two 2018 Diamond GEM awards.

References

External links

American chief executives in the media industry
University of California, Los Angeles alumni
Georgetown University Law Center alumni
1967 births
Living people
Tokyopop
American producers
Anime people
American graphic novelists